The 2002 Metro Atlantic Athletic Conference baseball tournament took place from May 23 through 25, 2002. The top four regular season finishers of the league's teams met in the double-elimination tournament held at Dutchess Stadium in Wappingers Falls, New York.  won their third consecutive (and third overall) tournament championship and earned the conference's automatic bid to the 2002 NCAA Division I baseball tournament.

Seeding 
The top four teams were seeded one through four based on their conference winning percentage. They then played a double-elimination tournament.

Results

All-Tournament Team 
The following players were named to the All-Tournament Team.

Most Valuable Player 
Mike Sidoti was named Tournament Most Valuable Player. Sidoti batted .417 with 5 RBI for the Tournament, including a 2–5, 3 RBI performance in the final.

References 

Tournament
Metro Atlantic Athletic Conference Baseball Tournament
Metro Atlantic Athletic Conference baseball tournament